Johann Reichsgraf von Aldringen (sometimes spelled  Altringer or Aldringer; 10 December 158822 June 1634) was an Austrian soldier active before and during the Thirty Years' War. He was born in Luxembourg in the Duchy of Luxembourg, and after travelling as a nobleman's page in France, Italy and the Netherlands, he went to the University of Paris.

In 1606 he entered the service of Spain, in which he remained until 1618, when he joined the imperial army. Here he distinguished himself in the field and in the cabinet. Made a colonel in 1622, two years later he was employed on the Council of War and on diplomatic missions. At the bridge of Dessau in 1626 he performed very distinguished service against Ernst von Mansfeld. He and his constant comrade Matthias Gallas were ennobled on the same day, and in the course of the Italian campaign of 1630 the two officers married the two daughters of Count d'Arco.

Aldringer served as Count Rambold Collalto's major-general in this campaign and was present at the taking of Mantua on July 18, 1630 during the War of Mantuan Succession. The plunder of the duke of Mantua's treasures made Gallas and Aldringer wealthy men. Back in Germany in 1631, he served after Breitenfeld as Tilly's artillery commander, and, elevated to the dignity of count of the Empire, he was present at the battle of the Lech, where he was wounded.

When Tilly died of his wounds Aldringer succeeded to the command. Made field-marshal after the assault of the Alte Veste near Nuremberg, at which he had been second in command under the Herzog von Friedland (with whom he was a great favourite), he was next placed at the head of the corps formed by Duke Maximilian I of Bavaria to support Wallenstein. In this post his tact and diplomatic ability were put to a severe test in the preservation of harmony between the two dukes. Finally Count Aldringer was won over by the court party which sought to displace the too successful duke of Friedland. After Wallenstein's death Aldringer commanded against the Swedes on the Danube, until being killed during the battle of Landshut (July 22, 1634). His great possessions descended to his sister, and thence to the family of Clary and Aldringen.

References

Notes

1588 births
1634 deaths
17th-century Austrian people
Johann
Counts of Austria
Lorraine nobility
Lorraine-German people
Austrian people of French descent
People from Thionville
Field marshals of the Holy Roman Empire
17th-century Spanish military personnel
Military personnel of the Thirty Years' War